Teretriosoma is a genus of clown beetles in the family Histeridae. There are about 11 described species in Teretriosoma.

Species
These 11 species belong to the genus Teretriosoma:
 Teretriosoma cavifrons Lewis, 1888
 Teretriosoma chalybaeum Horn, 1873
 Teretriosoma conigerum Lewis, 1888
 Teretriosoma festivum Lewis, 1879
 Teretriosoma paradoxum Lewis, 1888
 Teretriosoma pinguis Casey
 Teretriosoma prasinum Lewis, 1902
 Teretriosoma sexualis Schaeffer
 Teretriosoma unicorne Lewis, 1901
 Teretriosoma virens (Marseul, 1856)
 Teretriosoma viridicatum Lewis, 1891

References

Further reading

 
 

Histeridae
Articles created by Qbugbot